Lalo is a masculine nickname. It is a common nickname for Eduardo, Eladio, Gerardo, Wenceslao, and Gonzalo, according to Spanish naming customs. Notable people with this nickname include:

 Eduar Lalo Alcaraz (born 1964), Hispanic-American cartoonist
 Abelardo Delgado (1931–2004), Chicano writer, community organizer, and poet
 Eduardo Lalo Ebratt (born 1993), Colombian singer
 Eduardo Lalo Fernández (born 1992), Mexican footballer
 Gonzalo Lalo García (1971–2015), Spanish basketball player
 Eulalio González (1921–2003), Mexican actor, humorist, singer-songwriter, screenwriter, announcer, film director and film producer
 Eduardo Lalo Guerrero (1916–2005), Mexican-American guitarist, singer and farm labor activist
 Raúl Maradona (born 1966), Argentine former professional footballer 
 Lalo Schifrin (born 1932), Argentine-American pianist, composer, arranger and conductor
 Lalo Rodríguez, a ring name, along with Ciclón Negro, of professional wrestler Ramon Eduardo Rodriguez (1932–2013)
 Lalo Salamanca, a fictitious drug lord from the TV series Better Call Saul

See also

Lists of people by nickname
Spanish-language hypocorisms